Jacques P. Dupuis (born November 25, 1948) is a Canadian politician and lawyer.  A member of the Quebec Liberal Party and former MNA for Saint-Laurent in the Montreal region, Dupuis is also a former Quebec Minister of Justice and was Minister of Public Security until 2010.

Born in Montreal, Quebec, Dupuis has a law degree from the Université de Montréal and was named to the Barreau du Québec in 1974. and is a former lawyer. He was a lawyer from 1974 to 1986 and from 1996 to 1997. He was also a designated teacher in Halifax, Nova Scotia a chief of staff for the Ministry of Workforce, Income Security and vocational training and for the Quebec Liberal Party and an Attorney General. He was also the vice-president of Association of Criminal Defence Lawyers of Montreal and a member of the Administrative Law Society.

He was first elected in the 1998 election in the riding of Saint-Laurent. In his first term, as an opposition member, he sat as critic to the Minister of Public Security from 1999 to 2003. He was re-elected in the 2003 election. In his second term he was named to the Cabinet, and also served as Minister of Reform of Democratic Institutions and Minister Responsible for the Laurentides Region and the Lanaudière from 2003 to 2005.

He was re-elected in 2007, and was renamed the Minister of Public Security and was added the portfolio of Justice but was no longer the Government House Leader and Deputy Premier, positions that were given to Jean-Marc Fournier and Nathalie Normandeau respectively.

Following his re-election in 2008, Dupuis kept his Public Safety Minister portfolio while adding the Canadian Intergovernmental Affairs and Democratic Institutions Reform but gave up the Justice portfolio to newcomer Kathleen Weil. In addition, Dupuis was renamed the House Leader after Fournier did not run for re-election. On June 23, 2009, Dupuis gave up on request the portfolio of Canadian Intergovernmental Affairs to Claude Bechard during a cabinet shuffle.

He announced he was resigning from the National Assembly on August 9, 2010.

References

External links 
 

1948 births
Deputy premiers of Quebec
Justice ministers of Quebec
Lawyers from Montreal
Living people
Members of the Executive Council of Quebec
Politicians from Montreal
Quebec Liberal Party MNAs
Université de Montréal alumni
21st-century Canadian politicians